The 2008 KBS Drama Awards is a ceremony honoring the outstanding achievement in television on the Korean Broadcasting System (KBS) network for the year of 2008. It was held on December 31, 2008 and hosted by Choi Soo-jong and Han Ji-min.

Nominations and winners

References

External links
http://www.kbs.co.kr/drama/2008award/

KBS Drama Awards
KBS Drama Awards
KBS Drama Awards
KBS Drama Awards